This is a List of South Australian Ministries representing the Government of South Australia. In South Australia, the cabinet is interchangeably known as the ministry as there is no "outer ministry" – therefore all ministers are in cabinet. Cabinets generally include the Premier of South Australia, the Deputy Premier of South Australia, the Attorney-General of South Australia, the Treasurer of South Australia, alongside Ministers of specific portfolios.

Cabinets began with the 1st Ministry led by B. T. Finniss, which commenced on 24 October 1856 with the introduction of responsible government in South Australia. The current 74th Ministry is led by Peter Malinauskas of the South Australian Labor Party, and was formed on 21 March 2022.

List
 Finniss
 Baker
 Torrens
 Hanson
 Reynolds (1)
 Reynolds (2)
 Waterhouse (1)
 Waterhouse (2)
 Dutton (1)
 Ayers (1)
 Ayers (2)
 Blyth (1)
 Dutton (2)
 Ayers (3)
 Hart (1)
 Boucaut (1)
 Ayers (4)
 Hart (2)
 Ayers (5)
 Strangways (1)
 Strangways (2)
 Hart (3)
 Blyth (2)
 Ayers (6)
 Ayers (7)
 Blyth (3)
 Boucaut (2)
 Boucaut (3)
 Colton (1)
 Boucaut (4)
 Morgan
 Bray
 Colton (2)
 Downer (1)
 Playford II (1)
 Cockburn
 Playford II (2)
 Holder (1)
 Downer (2)
 Kingston
 Solomon
 Holder (2)
 Jenkins
 Butler I
 Price
 Peake (1)
 Verran
 Peake (2)
 Vaughan
 Peake (3)
 Barwell
 Gunn
 Hill (1)
 Butler II (1)
 Hill (2)
 Richards
 Butler II (2)
 Playford IV (1)
 Playford IV (2)
 Walsh
 Dunstan (1)
 Hall
 Dunstan (2)
 Corcoran
 Tonkin
 Bannon
 Arnold
 Brown
 Olsen
 Kerin 
 Rann
 Weatherill
 Marshall
 Malinauskas

See also 

Department of the Premier and Cabinet (South Australia)
Chief Secretary of South Australia
 Commissioner of Public Works (South Australia)

South Australian ministries